Peter Lundgren (born 29 January 1965) is a former professional male tennis player and tennis coach from Sweden. He preferred playing indoors, hardcourt and on grass to clay.

Playing career
Lundgren was one of the second generation of Swedish players along with Mats Wilander, Stefan Edberg, Joakim Nyström, Anders Järryd, Henrik Sundström, Hans Simonsson and Kent Carlsson that followed after the success of Björn Borg. He left Sundsvall as an 18-year-old and moved to Stockholm, to further his tennis career.

In 1984 Lundgren finished the year ranked at 265. At the end of the 1985 season Lundgren jumped up 234 places on ranking list to finish at number 31. In the process he won his first title in Cologne as a qualifier defeating Wojtek Fibak, Goran Prpić, Jeremy Bates and Tim Wilkison before defeating Ramesh Krishnan in the final. After the title win he was hailed as "the new Björn Borg", in reference to his talent and the long hair that bore resemblance to Borg and that he had trained with him as well. Lundgren's best ranking was 25th in the world, but at the time he was only the 7th best Swede behind Mats Wilander, Stefan Edberg, Anders Järryd, Joakim Nyström, Henrik Sundström and Jan Gunnarsson.

This was the golden age of Swedish tennis in which Lundgren said "We had at most 14 players in the top 100. ( Don’t forget the size of the Swedish population, it makes it even better this achievement)". Lundgren while managing to have some big wins over Ivan Lendl, Mats Wilander, Michael Chang, Jim Courier, Thomas Muster and Pete Sampras, was not able to achieve consistency and he said himself that "I was a little up and down. Sometimes I could lose motivation and then suddenly get thrashed against lower ranked players." He played his last match on tour against Karol Kučera in Copenhagen Open and retired at 30 years of age and then went into coaching.

Coaching
Lundgren first made a name for himself as a coach when he took Marcelo Ríos into the top 10 and then they split ways, when Lundgren said that "he needed a psychologist more than a coach". After that he was working for the Swiss Tennis Federation helping out with the juniors, he replaced Peter Carter as coach for Roger Federer they worked together from 2000 to end of 2003 before eventually splitting.

Lundgren then took over coaching Marat Safin and guided him to the 2005 Australian Open championship and worked with him until
August 2006. In September 2006, it was announced that he would be helping out the British Davis Cup team for the next two years.

He was given a "leave of absence" from the LTA in June 2007. In 2008 Lundgren took some time away from his job, because his father was ill, though he later expressed interest to return to work with British tennis. During 2008 he started coaching the Cypriot tennis player Marcos Baghdatis. In February 2009 Lundgren started coaching Grigor Dimitrov from Bulgaria. He then coached Stanislas Wawrinka. In September 2011 Lundgren and Wawrinka split. Lundgren has since gone on to teach Vicht virtual tennis coaching in Houston, Texas. In March 2014 Lundgren began to coach Daniela Hantuchová.

Grand Slam finals

Doubles: 1 (1 loss)

ATP Career Finals

Singles: 6 (3 titles, 3 runner-ups)

ATP Career Finals

Doubles: 10 (3 titles, 7 runner-ups)

ATP Challenger and ITF Futures finals

Doubles: 1 (1–0)

Performance timelines

Singles

Doubles

References

External links
 
 
 

1965 births
Hopman Cup competitors
Living people
People from Kramfors Municipality
Swedish tennis coaches
Swedish male tennis players
Sportspeople from Västernorrland County